Taddeo di Bartolo  (c. 1363 – 26 August 1422), also known as Taddeo Bartoli,  was an Italian painter of the Sienese School during the early Renaissance.  He is among the artists profiled in  Vasari's biographies of artists or Vite. Vasari claims he is the uncle of Domenico di Bartolo.

Biography
Taddeo di Bartolo was born in Siena. The exact year of his birth is unknown, but it’s been suspected to be between 1363-65. He was the son of a certain Bartolo di Maestro Mino, a barber, and not of the painter Bartolo di Fredi, as Vasari believed, and therefore not the brother of Andrea di Bartolo. Around 1389 he entered the Sienese Guild of artists, where he mastered the art of painting among his Sienese colleagues. In 1389 Taddeo traveled to Collegarli, the San Miniato al Tedesco hills, and Pisa.  The painting of The Virgin and Child Enthroned, signed and dated in 1390 and created in the church of San Paolo in Pisa, is one of Taddeo’s first documented works. In 1393, Taddeo traveled to San Gimignano, where he executed the altarpiece of the Virgin and Child and Saints (1395) for the Sardi and Campigli Chapel in San Francesco. The Virgin and Child With Saints showcases Taddeo’s earlier style. The thin, elegant figures, and flowing lines of the drapery patterns reflect influence from his Sienese predecessors, such as Simone Martini and Ambrogio Lorenzetti.

From 1400-01, Taddeo worked at the Palazzo Pubblico in Siena where he created twelve small panels, of which only nine exist today, displayed at the Opera of the Duomo in Siena. These panels give reverence to Taddeo’s craftsmanship in smaller scale work, like many of his contemporaries in the trecento. Around 1401, Taddeo painted the celebrated altarpiece, Assumption of the Virgin and scenes from the Passion, in Montepulciano. The intention of this piece was for religious and devotional functions. Taddeo worked to accommodate the established conventions of altarpiece painting, while simultaneously stylizing the pieces to fit their respective site.  In 1403, Taddeo produced two works in Perugia, now on display in their public gallery. The Virgin and Child with two Angels and St Bernard and Descent of the Holy Ghost. These two works showcase Taddeo’s superior talents, exhibiting delicate coloring and vast human expression; though they have been painted over throughout the years.

In 1406, Taddeo was commissioned to destroy all the paintings in the chapel of the Palazzo Pubblico, and repaint the inside. Many of these paintings represent the Life of the Madonna, including the Death of the Virgin in which Jesus descends, takes her hand, and receives her in the form of an infant. In 1422, Taddeo di Bartolo died in Siena, about age 60.

Works
Much of his early work was in Pisa, where he was responsible for the frescoes of Paradise and Hell in the Cathedral, and for paintings in the Palazzo Pubblico and the church of San Francesco.

At the Collegiata di San Gimignano, Taddeo painted a fresco depicting The Last Judgment. The Museo Civico of San Gimignano, displays a painting by Taddeo depicting Saint Gimignano holding the town in his lap (c. 1391).

A triptych of the Virgin and Child with St John the Baptist and St Andrew, painted around 1395, is on display at the Szépművészeti Museum of Fine Arts in Budapest. A massive triptych, Assumption of the Virgin, painted in 1401, is displayed in the 16th-century Duomo of Santa Maria dell'Assunta at Montepulciano.

Taddeo's Madonna with Child, Four Angels and Saint John the Baptist and Saint Andrew may be seen in the Oratory of the Company of Saint Catherine of the Night at Santa Maria della Scala, Siena. He also painted allegories and figures from Roman history (1413–14), and the Funeral of the Virgin (1409) at the Palazzo Pubblico in Siena. His St Elizabeth of Hungary is on display in the Perkins Collection of the Basilica of St Francis in Assisi.

Other works and current locations
 Madonna and Child (c. 1400), painted with tempera and oil on a panel, in the Wadsworth Atheneum
 Madonna and Child in the Museum of Fine Arts in San Francisco
 Madonna and Child in the Musée du Petit Palais in Avignon, France
 "Madonna and Child" in the Ball State University Museum of Art in Muncie, Indiana 
 Saint Germinianus in the Snite Museum of Art in Notre Dame, Indiana
 Annunciation in the Bergen Art Museum in Bergen, Norway
 Annunciation (1401) in the campus chapel of Australian Catholic University in Melbourne  
 Christ Meeting Mother on Way to Calvary in the Worcester Art Museum in Massachusetts
 Madonna and Child With Angels in the Fogg Art Museum in Cambridge, Massachusetts
 Madonna and Child and Saints in the Palazzo Blu in Pisa
 "The Crucifixion" in the Art Institute of Chicago

Gallery

See also
Andrea di Bartolo
Domenico di Bartolo
Gregorio di Cecco

References

External links

Madonna and Child, with Four Angels, St. John the Baptist, St. Andrew, dated 1400, by Taddeo di Bartolo, Oratory of the Company of Saint Catherine of the Night, Santa Maria della Scala, Siena.
Apollo and Athena fresco c.1414  in the Anticapella of the Palazzo Pubblico, Siena.
Madonna and Child, by Taddeo di Bartolo, Legion of Honor Museum of Fine Arts, San Francisco.
Triptych of the Assumption of the Virgin, 1401, by Taddeo di Bartolo, Montepulciano, Italy.
Madonna and Child, by Taddeo di Bartolo, Musée du Petit Palais, Avignon, France.

14th-century Italian painters
Italian male painters
15th-century Italian painters
Trecento painters
Painters from Siena
Gothic painters
1360s births
1422 deaths